"When the Spirit Moves You" is the sixteenth episode of the 1969 ITC British television series Randall and Hopkirk (Deceased) starring Mike Pratt and Kenneth Cope. The episode was first broadcast on 2 January 1970 on ITV and was directed by Ray Austin.

Annette Andre does not appear in this episode. Unlike "The House on Haunted Hill", the non-appearance of Andre's character Jeannie Hopkirk is not explained in this episode. At the end of this episode Andre does receive a credit despite not appearing in it. At the end of "The House on Haunted Hill", Andre received no credit.

Synopsis
Jeff becomes involved with a bumbling alcoholic conman named Bream and a stash of $125,000 of stolen bonds from the United States that a criminal racket are after. Jeff goes ahead with a deal to exchange the bonds that he and Bream have for $125,000 of the criminal racket's cash. When Jeff and Bream manage to double-cross them, they turn the tables and come within seconds of blowing up Jeff with the safe that he deposited the money in.

Overview
In this episode Marty finds that he is able to communicate with the alcoholic Bream (Anton Rodgers) but only when he is very drunk from whisky. This is also one of the first episodes where Marty physically threatens to haunt somebody as a traditional ghost would, in order to force him to give Jeff a helping hand.

Cast

Mike Pratt as Jeff Randall
Kenneth Cope as Marty Hopkirk
Anton Rodgers .... Calvin P. Bream
Penny Brahms .... Girl in Luxury Flat
Peter J. Elliott ....  Wilks
Michael Gothard ....  Perrin
Richard Kerley ....  Sgt. Hinds
Reg Lye .... Manny
Anthony Marlowe .... Cranley
Kieron Moore .... Miklos Corri
Bill Reed .... Parkin

Production
Although the 16th episode in the series, That's How Murder Snowballs was the 13th episode to be shot, filmed between November 1968 and March 1969.

References

External links

Episode overview at Randallandhopkirk.org.uk
Filming locations at Randallandhopkirk.org.uk

Randall and Hopkirk (Deceased) episodes
1970 British television episodes